Sergio Ibáñez Banon (born 19 January 1999) is a Spanish Paralympic judoka. He won a silver medal in the men's 66 kg event at the 2020 Summer Paralympics held in Tokyo, Japan.

References

1999 births
Living people
Spanish male judoka
Paralympic judoka of Spain
Paralympic silver medalists for Spain
Paralympic medalists in judo
Judoka at the 2020 Summer Paralympics
Medalists at the 2020 Summer Paralympics
Place of birth missing (living people)
21st-century Spanish people